Valley Mall is a super-regional shopping mall serving Hagerstown, Western Maryland and nearby communities in West Virginia and Pennsylvania. Valley Mall is the only indoor mall in the Hagerstown Metropolitan Area since the other closed, Martinsburg Mall. Anchor stores include Belk, Dick's Sporting Goods, JCPenney, Onelife Fitness, and Tilt Studio.

History
Valley Mall, developed by Shopco Development Company of New York City, officially opened its doors on 15 August 1974. It was considered the second mall to open in Western Maryland and the Tri-State Area (the first being its then-sister mall Frederick Towne Mall in Frederick, Maryland, which opened in 1972). The mall opened with 90 stores anchored by Montgomery Ward, Eyerly's, JCPenney, McCrory's, Peoples Drug, Carmike Cinemas 3, and Pantry Pride grocery store.

Many changes have come to the mall over the years. Within a short time of opening, Eyerly's became The Bon-Ton, and a partial second floor with mostly small crafts stores opened. In 1995, the mall underwent a major renovation inside, including the removal of the second floor. Also in the 1990s, Peoples Drug and McCrory's closed and were replaced by small shops. Pantry Pride's location became Martin's, and Martin's moved and was replaced by Toys R Us. In 1999–2000, the mall expanded with a new wing to include Old Navy, a food court, Hecht's department store, a 16-screen multiplex, and additional small stores. In 2003, Sears moved from Long Meadow shopping center in northern Hagerstown to replace Montgomery Ward, which closed all of its remaining stores in 2001. In 2006, Hecht's became Macy's as part of the retirement of the Hecht's nameplate. Macy's closed its Valley Mall location in April 2016. On June 22, 2017, it was announced that Sears would be closing as part of a plan to close 20 stores nationwide. The store closed in September 2017. On July 22, 2017, it was announced that Bon-Ton would be closing in February 2018 as it lease expires which will leave JCPenney as the only anchor left, however on October 18, 2018, Belk opened up in the former space of Bon-Ton, making Valley Mall having once again 2 anchor stores since the closure of Bon-Ton. On December 13, 2017, it was announced that the former Macy's would be replaced by a Tilt Studio which opened up in September 2018, and a Onelife Fitness which opened up in January 2019. Dick's Sporting Goods opened in the former Sears in 2020. Old Navy is leaving the mall on January 22, 2023 and relocating in the shopping center behind the mall.

References

External links
Valley Mall
PREIT Website

Shopping malls in Maryland
Shopping malls established in 1974
Buildings and structures in Washington County, Maryland
Hagerstown metropolitan area
Pennsylvania Real Estate Investment Trust
1974 establishments in Maryland